Hardwick is a town in Worcester County, Massachusetts, United States, about  west of the city of Worcester. It had a population of 2,667 at the 2020 census. It includes the villages of Hardwick, Gilbertville, Wheelwright and Old Furnace.

History 
Hardwick was first settled in 1737 and was officially incorporated in 1739, named in honor of Philip Yorke, Lord Hardwicke, an English nobleman. In 1762, General Timothy Ruggles, one of the leading Tories of New England, introduced the Hardwick Fair, now the oldest annual fair in the United States. During the late 1800s, Hardwick experienced an expansion of its manufacturing industry, textile and paper mills, both of which left the area by the 1930s. The town has retained its agricultural roots, a long-standing tradition in the region. Hardwick is the home of Eagle Hill School, founded in 1967.

Geography and transportation
Hardwick was one of the towns which gained lands (though lost some land area) by the building of the Quabbin Reservoir. The reservoir's waters extend into the town along the former East Branch of the Swift River, which once ran through the northwest corner of town. Thanks to the disincorporation of the towns which the Quabbin Reservoir and its reservation lands now lie on, Hardwick gained a small portion of the former town of Greenwich along the northwest corner of town, though it is the smallest portion of land gained by any of the towns surrounding the reservoir. The town lies along the edge of the former Swift River Valley, with Muddy Brook and the former East Branch of the Swift River draining the western part of town, and the Ware River draining the eastern portion. The lands along the Ware, especially in the far eastern part of town, are marshy. The town has some open areas, and a portion of the lands not already protected as part of the Quabbin Reservation are part of the Muddy Brook Wildlife Management Area.

Hardwick lies along the western edge of Worcester County, bordered by Hampshire County to the southwest. It is bordered by Petersham to the northwest, Barre to the northeast, New Braintree to the southeast and Ware to the southwest.

Hardwick has no interstates or limited access highways within town, lying approximately halfway between Interstate 90, also known as the Massachusetts Turnpike, to the south and Route 2 to the north. The southern neighborhood of Gilbertville is the location of the intersection of Route 32 and the southern terminus of Route 32A, with Route 32 coming from Ware heading northeast towards Barre, and Route 32A heading due north through the town's center towards the center of Petersham, where its northern end lies.  The Massachusetts Central Railroad line passes through the town from Palmer towards Barre, roughly following the path of Route 32. It does not carry passenger rail, however, not having done so since the early twentieth century. The nearest private airport is the Tanner-Hiller Airport in New Braintree, and the nearest national air service can be reached at Bradley International Airport in Connecticut.

Demographics

As of the census of 2000, there were 2,622 people, 997 households, and 689 families residing in the town. The racial makeup of the town was 97.79% White, 0.53% African American, 0.15% Native American, 0.11% Asian, 0.19% from other races, and 1.22% from two or more races. Hispanic or Latino of any race were 0.88% of the population.

There were 997 households, out of which 34.9% had children under the age of 18 living with them, 56.4% were married couples living together, 8.3% had a female householder with no husband present, and 30.8% were non-families. 25.8% of all households were made up of individuals, and 13.2% had someone living alone who was 65 years of age or older.  The average household size was 2.57 and the average family size was 3.08.

In the town, the population was spread out, with 28.0% under the age of 18, 6.9% from 18 to 24, 28.6% from 25 to 44, 22.7% from 45 to 64, and 13.7% who were 65 years of age or older.  The median age was 38 years. For every 100 females there were 94.9 males.  For every 100 females age 18 and over, there were 95.0 males.

The median income for a household in the town was $45,742, and the median income for a family was $54,667. Males had a median income of $37,763 versus $30,057 for females. The per capita income for the town was $20,824.  About 5.5% of families and 7.5% of the population were below the poverty line, including 5.7% of those under age 18 and 10.9% of those age 65 or over.

Government

Education

Hardwick is part of the Quabbin Regional School District, along with Barre, Hubbardston, New Braintree, and Oakham. Elementary School Students attend Hardwick Elementary School from grades K–6, middle school students attend Quabbin Regional Middle School from grades 7–8, and high school students attend Quabbin Regional High School from grades 9–12.

Library

The public library in Hardwick was established in 1892. In fiscal year 2008, the town of Hardwick spent 1.58% ($64,023) of its budget on its public library—approximately $24 per person. In fiscal year 2017, the town budget provided the library with 1.16 percent of the total budget, or $26.18 per year for each resident.

Notable people
Adeliza Perry, Civil War nurse, writer, educator, born in Hardwick
Jonathan Robinson (American politician), United States Senator from Vermont
 Moses Robinson, Governor of Vermont
 Carrie Stevens, model 
 Squire Whipple, engineer

References

External links

Town of Hardwick
 "Main Streets and Back Roads: Hardwick, Massachusetts" , Chronicle HD, WCVB-TV, Boston, Monday, October 22, 2012.

 
Towns in Massachusetts
Towns in Worcester County, Massachusetts
Populated places established in 1737
1737 establishments in Massachusetts